The 2011 Oregon State Beavers football team represented Oregon State University during the 2011 NCAA Division I FBS football season. The team's head coach was Mike Riley, in his ninth straight season and eleventh overall. Home games were played at Reser Stadium in Corvallis, and they are members of the North Division of the Pac-12 Conference. The Beavers finished the season 3–9 overall and 3–6 in Pac-12 play to finish in fifth place in the North Division. The team finished with their worst record since 1996.

Schedule

Roster

Game summaries

Sacramento State

The Sacramento State Hornets defeated Oregon State in overtime on September 3, 29–28. The Hornets had second possession in overtime, and after quarterback Jeff Fleming made a 6-yard touchdown pass to wide receiver Brandyn Reed to pull within one point, the Hornets attempted a two-point conversion for the win. Fleming and Reed connected again for the two-point conversion and the 1-point victory. During Oregon State's possession in overtime, running back Malcolm Agnew put the Beavers ahead by 7 with a 17-yard touchdown run. For the game, Agnew ran for 223 yards and three touchdowns on 33 carries to lead the Beavers. After the Beavers trailed 14–3 at halftime, quarterback Ryan Katz was replaced by redshirt freshman Sean Mannion. Mannion finished the day with eight completion on 12 attempts and 143 yards, while Katz managed 11 completions on 22 attempts and 87 yards. James Rodgers did not play for the Beavers due to a lingering knee injury.

Wisconsin

UCLA

UCLA leads the series 40–15–4 that began in 1930 and played in Los Angeles, Corvallis, Portland and Tokyo (1980 Mirage Bowl). The Bruins won last year 17–14 on Kai Forbath's 51-yard field goal on the last play of the game.

Wide receiver James Rodgers made his return to the lineup for the Beavers after being out almost a year with a knee injury suffered against Arizona the previous season.

Arizona State

Arizona

BYU

Washington State

Utah

Stanford

California

Washington

Oregon

Player death
Fred Thompson, a true freshman defensive end, died in the early evening of December 7, 2011 in Corvallis. According to OSU officials, Thompson was playing basketball at the Dixon Recreation Center on the OSU campus when he collapsed. He was transported to Good Samaritan Hospital in Corvallis where he was pronounced dead. Thompson was from Richmond, California. He was 19 years old.

References

Oregon State
Oregon State Beavers football seasons
Oregon State Beavers football